Alajos Hauszmann (also called as Alois, June 9, 1847 – July 31, 1926) was a Hungarian architect, professor, and member of the Hungarian Academy of Sciences.

Life
Hauszmann was born in Buda in 1847 into a family of Bavarian origin as the son of Ferenc Hauszmann and Anna Maár (siblings: Hermina (1845–1929), Ferenc (1850–1918) and Kornélia (1854-1837)).  He studied painting from 1861, then became a bricklayer's apprentice.  In 1864 he attended Technical University of Budapest, and in 1866 he continued architecture studies at the Bauakademie in Berlin, along with Ödön Lechner.
 1868 Assistant Professor at the Technical University of Budapest
 1869-1870. Grand tour of Italy to study renaissance architecture
 1872 Professor at the Technical University for the next 40 years
 1874 Married Mariette Senior, whom he met in Berlin
 Designed barracks for the Red Cross, to be known as Hauszmann-barracks in Austria and Switzerland
 1891 Named chief architect for Buda Castle in Budapest
 Received the Order of Franz Joseph, Grand Cross

Hauszmann employed several architects who later became prominent in their own right, including Albert Kálmán Kőrössy. In 1912 Hauszmann retired, and a year later he created a foundation for young architects graduating from the Technical University.  In 1914 he went on an extended journey to Egypt and the Holy Land.  In 1918 he was ennobled by King Charles IV of Hungary; however, in the following year, his private home was confiscated during the Hungarian Soviet Republic.  In 1924 he was elected an honorary member of the Hungarian Academy of Sciences.  He died, aged 79, in Velence.

Major works

Architecture and design

 1870 German Theater, Budapest (destroyed by fire in 1890)
 1870 Kiosk, Erzsébet tér, Budapest (destroyed)
 1871-1872 Tüköry palace, Budapest (destroyed)
 1874-1875 Coburg palace, Budapest (destroyed)
 1876 Church of the Sacred Heart, Gyoma
 1876-1878 Kégl mansion, Székesfehérvár
 1877-1878 City Hall and theater, Szombathely (destroyed)
 1878 Stefánia Yacht Club, Balatonfüred
 1878-1879 Kégl palace, Budapest
 1878-1880 St. Stephen Hospital, Budapest
 1881-1883 Austro-Hungarian Bank, Szombathely
 1882 Hungarian Parliament Building, Budapest (prize winning design, not built)
 1882-1884 Erzsébet Hospital for the Red Cross, Budapest
 1883-1884 Teachers' Training College, Budapest
 1883-1884 Főreáliskola, Budapest
 1884 Teachers' Training Institute, Budapest
 1884 Scottish Abbey, Budapest (destroyed)
 1884-1885 Nádasdy Mansion renovation and chapel, Nádasdladány
 1884-1885 Batthyány palace, Budapest
 1884-1886 Girls' Lyceum, Sopron
 1884-1889 University Pathology Institute, Kolozsvár (today Cluj-Napoca)
 1886 University Public Health Institute, Kolozsvár (today Cluj-Napoca)
 1886 State Institute for Teaching Women, Budapest
 1886-1887 Institute for Forensic Medicine, Budapest
 1887-1889 Northeast Railroad Company apartment building, Budapest
 1887-1889 Technical Training School and Museum, Budapest
 1888-1890 Budapest Court House and Penitentiary, Budapest
 1889-1890 commercial building, Budapest
 1890 Kálmán Széll's mansion, Rátót
 1890-1894 County hospital, Nitra
 1891-1905 Buda Castle, Budapest, including the interiors
 1891 Hauszmann house, Budapest
 1890-1894 New York Palace, Budapest
 1893 General Hospital, Kolozsvár (today Cluj-Napoca)
 1893-1896 Royal Hungarian Palace of Justice, Budapest (Kúria, today: Ethnographic Museum)
 1893-1897 Governor's Palace, Rijeka
 1902-1909 Royal Joseph Technical University, central building, Budapest
 1904 City Hall, Nagyvárad (today Oradea)
 1910 National Theater, Budapest (not built)

Publications
 A budapesti igazságügyi palota (Magy. Mérnök és Építész Egyl. Közl., 1897)
 A kir. József műegyetem új otthona (Magy. Mérnök és Építész Egyl. Közl., 1909)
 A magyar királyi vár (Budapest, 1912)
 Budapest városának építészeti fejlődésének története (Akad. Ért. 1925).

References
 Gerle, János, ed. Hauszmann Alajos (Holnap Kiadó, Budapest, 2002) 

External links

 In Hungarian
 Magyar Életrajzi Lexikon
 Elek Artúr, "Hauszmann Alajos (1847–1926)", Nyugat, 1926. II. 311–312.p.

1847 births
1926 deaths
People from Buda
Hungarian architects
19th-century Hungarian people
Hungarian-German people
Hungarian people of German descent
Burials at Kerepesi Cemetery